Houbigant may refer to:
 Charles François Houbigant, Biblical scholar
 Jean-François Houbigant, owner/maker of the second oldest perfumery of France
 Houbigant (perfume), perfume manufacturer